General elections were held in Japan on 5 December 1976. Voter turnout was 73.45%. This election was noted for seeing 124 newcomers win seats for the very first time, along with the defeat of some legacy candidates, signalling a generational shift in the Japanese political landscape.  To date, the 1976 election has been the only post-war general election triggered by an expiration of the term of the House of Representatives; all other post-war elections have been instigated by a dissolution of the House by the Cabinet.

While the Liberal Democratic Party wound up, as usual, with more seats than any competing party, it lost 22 seats to finish with less than a majority, winning 249 of 511 races (47%), this election continued the constant trend of the LDP's popular vote decreasing with each election which had started all the way back in the 1949 election. The incumbent Prime Minister, Takeo Miki, was seen as a reformer within his own party, and he did not obstruct the investigations into the Lockheed scandal as some of those in his party had desired. Despite this, Miki's cabinet had lukewarm approval ratings, with positive ratings across different news sources ranging from 41-47% and negative ones being lower at 12-27%. The scandal reflected poorly on the LDP and the party lost 22 seats from the last election, in the process losing its majority control over the House of Representatives for the first time since the party's founding. However, when the LDP's showing is combined with the votes cast for the spin-off New Liberal Club as well as independents who were not endorsed by the LDP but joined the party after this election, the total number of votes for conservative candidates actually saw an overall increase.

The two left-wing opposition parties, the Japan Socialist Party and the Japanese Communist Party, saw noticeable setbacks. The JSP did gain seats, but it was only five, and in the process two former chairmen (Kōzō Sasaki and Seiichi Katsumata) and the incumbent vice-chairman and former chairman Saburō Eda all lost their seats. The JCP suffered far worse, losing 21 seats and falling to less than half its number of seats compared to the last election, likely due to protest votes going towards the new moderate options such as the NLC instead of the JCP. The main winners among the traditional opposition were the moderate parties. In the case of Kōmeitō, the party recovered from scandals in the 1972 general elections by distancing itself from Soka Gakkai and putting up non-Soka Gakkai adherents as candidates in the 1975 local elections as well as this election. Komeito also reinforced its image as an anti-LDP party by endorsing various leftist campaigns. On the other hand, the Democratic Socialist Party, which did see a slight decrease in popular votes, nonetheless had managed to gain ten seats in this election.

Following the election, Miki resigned as LDP leader after the LDP's poor showing and Takeo Fukuda was elected the new LDP leader and prime minister.

Results

By prefecture

References

Japan
1976 elections in Japan
General elections in Japan
December 1976 events in Asia
Election and referendum articles with incomplete results